Philip Edward Gunter (6 January 1932 – 13 July 2007) was an English footballer who played for Portsmouth and Aldershot.

Career
Gunter spent most of his career with Portsmouth, making over 300 league appearances for the club between 1951 and 1964. He finished his career with Aldershot.

Gunter also represented his country at an international level, playing once for England B and England under-23's.

Personal life
In the 1970s and 1980s Gunter taught PE and Games at Bedales School in Petersfield Hampshire. Gunter moved to Australia after retiring. He was the older brother of David Gunter, who also played in the English Football League.

References

External links
 Career statistics at Post War English & Scottish Football League Database

1932 births
2007 deaths
Footballers from Portsmouth
English footballers
Association football defenders
England B international footballers
England under-23 international footballers
Portsmouth F.C. players
English Football League players
Aldershot F.C. players